Radio:Active Live at Wembley is a DVD by English pop punk band McFly. The DVD was filmed at Wembley Arena in London, during their Radio:Active Tour on 27 November 2008. The DVD includes over 80 minutes of concert footage, filmed by Grammy-nominated director Paul Caslin, as well as a 90-minute documentary on the band's tour.

Sonora, the largest digital music website in Brazil, issued six live recordings via their YouTube channel. The DVD topped the British DVD charts, and stayed in first position for three weeks. The concert was also issued as a live album.

DVD track listing
Concert footage
 One for the Radio
 Everybody Knows
 Going Through the Motions
 Obviously
 Transylvania
 Corrupted
 POV
 Falling in Love
 Star Girl
 That Girl
 Do Ya
 Black or White
 Room on the 3rd Floor
 All About You
 The Last Song
 Lies
 5 Colours in Her Hair

Notes 
 "Going Through the Motions", "Corrupted", "Black or White" and "The Last Song" were only performed on the European leg of the tour. 
 For the opening show at Curitiba Master Hall "The Heart Never Lies" and "Please, Please" were added to the setlist.

Album track listing

An album containing 12 recordings from the concert was issued around the same time as the DVD, mainly for their South American fans. It came in a standard jewel case.

 One for the Radio
 Corrupted
 Obviously
 Falling in Love
 Star Girl
 Do Ya?
 Black or White
 Room on the 3rd Floor
 All About You
 The Last Song
 Lies
 5 Colours in Her Hair

Release history

Chart performance

Tour dates
These tour dates are taken from setlist.fm.

See also 
 Radio:Active

References 

2009 video albums
McFly video albums
Live video albums
2009 live albums
McFly albums
McFly live albums